DWPE (729 AM) Radyo Pilipinas is a radio station owned and operated by the Philippine Broadcasting Service. Its studio is located at the Department of Agriculture Nursery Compound, Brgy. San Gabriel, Tuguegarao, while its transmitter is located at the Cagayan State University Carig Campus, Tuguegarao.

References

Radio stations in Cagayan
News and talk radio stations in the Philippines
Radio stations established in 1978